Connecticut's 86th House of Representatives district elects one member of the Connecticut House of Representatives. It consists of the town of North Branford as well as parts of Durham, Guilford, and Wallingford. It has been represented by Republican Vincent Candelora since 2007.

List of representatives

Recent elections

2020

2018

2016

2014

2012

References

86